Cleaver Lake is a lake in the Unorganized West Part of Timiskaming District in Northeastern Ontario, Canada. The primary inflow and outflow is Cleaver Creek, which flows into the West Montreal River, a tributary of the Montreal River and part of the Ottawa River system.

References

Lakes of Timiskaming District